Neopachygaster is a genus of flies in the family Stratiomyidae.

Species
Neopachygaster admiranda Krivosheina & Freidberg, 2004
Neopachygaster africana Lindner, 1938
Neopachygaster basilewskyi Lindner, 1955
Neopachygaster biafra Lindner, 1972
Neopachygaster caucasica Krivosheina, 2004
Neopachygaster congoensis Lindner, 1938
Neopachygaster eisentrauti Lindner, 1972
Neopachygaster intermedia (Krivosheina, 1965)
Neopachygaster kiboensis Lindner, 1953
Neopachygaster maculicornis (Hine, 1902)
Neopachygaster meromelaena (Dufour, 1841)
Neopachygaster occidentalis Kraft & Cook, 1961
Neopachygaster reniformis Hull, 1942
Neopachygaster secernibilis Krivosheina, 1973
Neopachygaster stackelbergi (Krivosheina & Rozkošný, 1990)
Neopachygaster stigma Lindner, 1938
Neopachygaster valida Lindner, 1938
Neopachygaster vitreus Hull, 1930
Neopachygaster wittei Lindner, 1958

References

Stratiomyidae
Brachycera genera
Taxa named by Ernest Edward Austen
Diptera of Africa
Diptera of Asia
Diptera of Europe
Diptera of North America